Timothy E. Kerr (born January 5, 1960) is a Canadian former professional ice hockey right winger who played 13 seasons in the National Hockey League (NHL) for the Philadelphia Flyers, New York Rangers and Hartford Whalers. Known for his goal-scoring offense, Kerr reached the NHL's prestigious 50-goal plateau on four occasions during his career, and he ranks 10th all time (minimum 200 goals) in goals per game with 0.565.  He was inducted to the Flyers Hall of Fame in 1994.

Playing career
Kerr was signed as an undrafted free agent by the Philadelphia Flyers in 1980. Though initially a winger with hands that could bruise an opponent's face as well as beat an opposing goaltender, it took three seasons before he staked his reputation as a lethal sniper. Kerr missed the majority of the 1982-83 season with knee issues and a broken leg, but turned things around starting in the 1983-84 season. That's when he began his team-record run of four consecutive 50-goal campaigns, in the process setting the NHL single-season record for power play goals with 34 in the 1985–86 season.

During the first round of the '85 playoffs, against the New York Rangers, Kerr set a still-standing NHL single-game record by scoring four goals in a span of 8:16 in the second period of an eventual 6–5 victory at Madison Square Garden which enabled Philadelphia to sweep the best-of-five series. The next season was particularly interesting, in that in September 1985 he was hospitalized with aseptic meningitis at the outset, but recovered sufficiently to set a career best of 58 goals. The following year, Kerr again victimized NHL goaltenders for 58 goals, finishing second in the NHL to Wayne Gretzky.

Kerr was an almost unmovable presence in the slot during his prime. Hockey Hall of Fame center and New York Islanders star Bryan Trottier once joked that the only way to stop Kerr was to wrap chains around his arms and legs. But Trottier retracted that statement almost immediately by saying that that still probably would not stop him.

However, Kerr's ascension into the ranks of NHL superstars was hindered by injuries and bad luck. In the 1985 playoffs, a knee injury hampered his ability to play in the final two rounds of the postseason. In 1987, a shoulder injury suffered in the second round cost him the entire final two series against the Montreal Canadiens and Edmonton Oilers.  As a result of the setback, Kerr endured five shoulder operations in a 14-month period and missed all but a handful of the 1987-88 regular season, while being largely ineffective in Philly's seven-game loss to the Washington Capitals in the Patrick Division Semifinals. While Kerr would rebound and play 69 games and score 48 goals in 1988-89—a feat which earned him the Bill Masterton Trophy for perseverance and dedication to the sport—he never again played more than half the schedule the rest of his career.

He was left exposed in the 1991 expansion draft, and after being claimed by the San Jose Sharks, was quickly dealt to the New York Rangers. One more season with the Hartford Whalers ensued, before his retirement at age 33. Additional personal tragedy struck and provided a somber end to his Flyers tenure.

Kerr finished his playing career 10th all-time in goals per game (minimum 500 games played) with 370 goals in 655 NHL regular season games.

Kerr is 2nd all time in career shooting percentage (20.3) in NHL playoff history (among players with 40+ career goals)

Personal life
On October 16, 1990, his wife, Kathy, died at the age of 30 due to a fast-spreading infection, ten days after the birth of their first child, a daughter named Kimberly.

He met his current wife, Midge, at the Tim Kerr Run in Avalon, New Jersey in 1991. Kerr has two daughters, Kimberly and Kayleigh, and three sons named Garrett, Wesley, and Tanner. Kerr currently resides in Moorestown Township, New Jersey and Avalon, New Jersey. Wesley and Tanner both graduated from University of Sciences Philadelphia and Wesley currently works for his father as a sales associate for Tim Kerr's Sotheby's International Realty. Kimberly graduated from West Virginia University.

Kerr is the owner of Tim Kerr's Sotheby's International Realty in Avalon, New Jersey, which sells and rents homes in both Avalon and Stone Harbor, New Jersey. In addition, Kerr owns the Pensacola Ice Flyers and part-owner of the Roanoke Rail Yard Dawgs, teams of the Southern Professional Hockey League.

Awards and honours
Named to the NHL Second All-Star Team (1987)
Awarded the Bill Masterton Trophy (1989)
Played in the NHL All-Star Game (1984, 1985, 1986)
 Inducted into the Flyers Hall of Fame on March 8, 1994.

NHL records
 Holds single-season record for most power play goals (34 in 1985–86)
 Holds playoff record for most power play goals in a period: (3)
 Holds playoff record for fastest 4-goals in a game: (8:16)
 Shares playoff record for most goals in a period (4 on April 13, 1985)
 Shares playoff record for most points in one period: (4)
 Shares NHL Playoff record for most goals by a player not to make Stanley Cup Finals (14)

Philadelphia Flyers franchise records
 Most 50-goal seasons (4)
 Most regular season power play goals in one season (34)
 Most regular season career power play goals (145)
 Most regular season hat tricks in one season (5)
 Most regular season career hat tricks (17)
 Highest regular season career goals per game average (0.60)
 Highest regular season goals per game average in one season (0.77)
 Most regular season goals scored in one game (4)
 Most regular season goals scored in one period (3)
 Most regular season power play goals scored in one game (3)
 Fastest 3 goals by a player in one regular season game (2:27)
 Most playoff goals scored in one period (4)
 Most playoff goals scored in one series (10)
 Most playoff points scored in one series (15)
 Most playoff power play goals in one post-season (8)
 Most playoff power play goals in one series (5)
 Most playoff power play goals scored in one period (3)
 Most playoff power play goals scored in one game (3)
 Most playoff assists in one period (3)
 Most playoff points in one period (4)
 Most playoff career hat tricks (3)
 Fastest 3 goals in playoffs by one player in one game (3:24)
 Fastest 4 goals in playoffs by one player in one game (8:16)

NHL achievements
 Led NHL in power play goals in one season (1984–85, 1985–86, 1986–87)
 Top 3 in goals in one season (1983–84, 1985–86, 1986–87)
 Top 5 in game-winning goals in one season (1984–85, 1985–86, 1986–87)
 Top 5 in goals per game average in one season (1984–85, 1985–86, 1986–87, 1988–89)
 Top 5 in hat tricks in one season (1988–89)
 Top 10 in goals in one season (1983–84, 1984–85, 1985–86, 1986–87, 1988–89)
 Top 10 in points in one season (1986–87)
 Top 10 in plus/minus in one season (1986–87)
 Top 10 in goals per game average in one season (1983–84, 1984–85, 1985–86, 1986–87, 1988–89, 1989–90)
 Top 10 in shooting percentage in one season (1980–81, 1986–87)
 Top 10 in even strength goals in one season (1983–84, 1984–85, 1986–87)
 Top 10 in goals created per game in one season (1984–85, 1986–87, 1988–89)
 Top 10 in points per game in one season (1986–87)
 Top 10 in offensive point shares in one season (1984–85, 1986–87)
 Top 10 in point shares in one season (1986–87)
 Top 10 in shots in one season (1983–84, 1985–86, 1986–87)

Career statistics

Regular season and playoffs

References
 The Greatest Players and Moments of the Philadelphia Flyers Fischler, Stan  pg. 27

External links
 
 Pensacola Ice Flyers website

1960 births
Living people
Bill Masterton Memorial Trophy winners
Canadian ice hockey right wingers
Hartford Whalers players
Ice hockey people from Ontario
Kingston Canadians players
Maine Mariners players
National Hockey League All-Stars
New York Rangers players
People from Avalon, New Jersey
People from Moorestown, New Jersey
Philadelphia Flyers players
Sportspeople from Windsor, Ontario
Undrafted National Hockey League players
Windsor Spitfires players